Krauthammer or Krauthamer is a surname. Notable people with the surname include:

Charles Krauthammer (1950–2018), American political columnist
Mandy Krauthammer Cohen, American health official
Peter A. Krauthamer (born 1957), American judge
Robert Andrzej Krauthammer, birth name of Polish-British pianist André Tchaikowsky (1935-1982)